Pamela Frydman is an American rabbi. She is the founding rabbi of Or Shalom Jewish Community, a San Francisco Jewish Renewal congregation.

Career
In 2002, Rabbi Frydman became the first female president of OHALAH (Association of Rabbis for Jewish Renewal). In 2010, she organized a letter signed by more than 400 rabbis, asking Jerusalem police to protect women at the Western Wall who want to pray and read the Torah together, one year after Nofrat Frenkel was arrested for taking out a Torah in the women's section of the Western Wall Plaza. Frydman is one of the international co-chairs for Rabbis for Women of the Wall. She is also the director of the Holocaust Education Project at the Academy for Jewish Religion in California.

See also
Timeline of women rabbis

References 

Jewish Renewal women rabbis
American Jewish Renewal rabbis
Religious leaders from the San Francisco Bay Area
Rabbis from California
Year of birth missing (living people)
Living people